Thomas William Bird (May 4, 1883 – June 9, 1958) was a politician and clergyman. He was elected to the House of Commons of Canada in 1921 as a Member of the Progressive Party to represent the riding of Nelson. He was re-elected in 1925 and again in 1926 then defeated in 1930. He died a natural death late in his life.

Bird played an unexpectedly pivotal role in the King–Byng Affair, as he fell asleep during debate on a motion of non-confidence in the 13th Canadian Ministry, and when re-awakened accidentally voted against the government, resulting in the non-confidence motion being passed by a single vote and the government falling as a result.

References

External links
 

1883 births
1958 deaths
English emigrants to Canada
Members of the House of Commons of Canada from Manitoba
Progressive Party of Canada MPs